This is a list of Tamil national-type primary schools (SJK(T)) in Perak, Malaysia. As of June 2022, there are 134 Tamil primary schools with a total of 11,231 students.

List of Tamil national-type primary schools in Perak

Batang Padang District 
As of June 2022, there are 12 Tamil primary schools with 640 students in Batang Padang District.

Manjung District
As of June 2022, there are 15 Tamil primary schools with 1,602 students in Manjung District.

Kinta District
As of June 2022, there are 17 Tamil primary schools with 3,452 students in Kinta District.

Kerian District
As of June 2022, there are 14 Tamil primary schools with 707 students in Kerian District.

Kuala Kangsar District
As of June 2022, there are 12 Tamil primary schools with 917 students in Kuala Kangsar District.

Hilir Perak District
As of June 2022, there are 12 Tamil primary schools with 746 students in Hilir Perak District.

Larut, Matang and Selama District
As of June 2022, there are 17 Tamil primary schools with 1,213 students in Larut, Matang and Selama District.

Hulu Perak District
As of June 2022, there are 3 Tamil primary schools with 73 students in Hulu Perak District.

Perak Tengah District
As of June 2022, there are 3 Tamil primary schools with 45 students in Perak Tengah District.

Kampar District
As of June 2022, there are 6 Tamil primary schools with 423 students in Kampar District.

Muallim District
As of June 2022, there are 7 Tamil primary schools with 568 students in Muallim District.

Bagan Datuk District
As of June 2022, there are 16 Tamil primary schools with 845 students in Bagan Datuk District.

See also 
Tamil primary schools in Malaysia
Lists of Tamil national-type primary schools in Malaysia

References

Schools in Perak
Perak
perak